The Piranhas River is a river of Tocantins state in central Brazil. The Piranhas joins the Araguaia River in the west-central area of Tocantins state near the municipality of Araguacema.

See also
List of rivers of Tocantins

References
Brazilian Ministry of Transport

Rivers of Tocantins